The Dog and Duck is a Grade II listed public house at 18 Bateman Street, Soho, London W1D 3AJ, built in 1897 by the architect Francis Chambers for Cannon Brewery.

It is on the Campaign for Real Ale's National Inventory of Historic Pub Interiors. The pub has an upstairs dining room named after the writer George Orwell.

References

Grade II listed pubs in the City of Westminster
Commercial buildings completed in 1897
National Inventory Pubs
19th-century architecture in the United Kingdom
Pubs in Soho